'Aja'ib al-Makhluqat wa Ghara'ib al-Mawjudat, (meaning The Wonders of Creatures and the Marvels of Creation) is an important work of cosmography by Zakariya al-Qazwini, who was born in Qazwin (Iran) in the year 600 AH/1203 AD.

Background to the work
Qazwini's Aja'ib al-Makhluqat is criticized for being less than original. Substantial parts of his work are derivative of Yaqut's Mu'jam al-Buldan.

Qazwini mentions fifty names as his sources, the most important of whom are old geographers and historians such as al-Istakhri, Ibn Fadlan, al-Mas‘udi, Ibn Hawqal, al-Biruni, Ibn al-Athir, al-Maqdisi, and al-Razi. Notwithstanding the fact that Qazwini's work is a compilation of known and unknown sources, it influenced later works of Islamic cosmology and Islamic geography through its style and language. Qazwini's cosmography is not pure science but it also was intended to entertain its readers by enriching scientific explanations with stories and poetry.

Framework

Qazwini's cosmography consists of two parts, the first part is celestial, dealing with the spheres of the heaven with its inhabitants (the angels) and chronology. Astronomical knowledge of that time is compiled together with astrological ideas.

The second part discusses the terrestrial: the four elements, the seven climes, seas and rivers, a sort of bestiary on the animal kingdom (including mankind and the jinns), the plants, and minerals. He discusses her man and the faculties of his soul, his character, weaknesses and illnesses.

Also, the cosmography of Ahmad al-Tusi (Aḥmad al-Ṭūsī) is very similar and bears the same title; though the latter characterized by the concept of the unity of God and the unity of creation..

Celestial cosmography
Qazwini tells that the earth was swinging in all directions, until God created an angel to bear it on his shoulders and steady it with his hands. A green Jacinth slab was placed underneath the angel, the slab borne by a gigantic bull Kuyūthā, which in turn rested on the great swimming fish Bahamūt.

Qazwini's cosmography above have been compared to a similar entry in Yaqut's Mu'jam al-Buldan and Ibn al-Wardī's Kharīdat al-'Ajā'ib, with small differences noted.

Time
When discussing time, Qazwini makes parallel comparison of the Islamic, Roman and Iranian calendars. Thus he links the days of the week to the sacred history of Judaism, Christianity, and Islam, e.g. the holy days Friday (Islamic day of congregational prayer/salah), Saturday (Jewish sabbath) and Sunday (Christian day of rest) and how they came to be regarded as holy. The days are also linked to lawful and unlawful things and acts.

Angelology

Qazwini shows that God created many things that are unknown to the people (Quran 16:8), and a fundamental part of this, with central importance, is God's Throne, His footstool are the angels and the jinn (demons, evil/good spirits).

The celestial spheres are inhabited by the angels. The angels are good perfect beings without negative feelings or passion, they are obedient and most importantly, they keep the order of the creation and govern everything on earth; the jinn and devils are bad and imperfect creatures who possess passion and wrath and are disobedient. Qazwini's work contains moreover angelology that has roots partly in the Quran and hadith.

There are two types of angels in the Quran, the one being the guards of hell (96:18) and angels that nearest to God (4:170, 83:21). Qazwini also mentions the angels who carry the Throne of God (the idea goes back to the Jahiliyya): they are four in number in the form of a man, bull, eagle and lion. On the Day of Resurrection the Throne will be carried by “eight” (Quran 69:17), and this traditionally refers to eight angels. Next to these is the angel ar-Ruh or the Spirit, who is actually first in order and the greatest. His breath quickens the creatures and he knows the order of the spheres, planets, elements, minerals etc.  He is the one who decides the movement and stillness of things by the will of God. This angel is followed by Israfil; he transmits the orders of God and blows the horn. He is not mentioned in the Quran but in hadith and linked to the Day of Resurrection. Israfil carries the “tablet” (lawh) and the “pen” (qalam). Whether the abovementioned angels or Gabriel, Michael or others all of them have a role in keeping the order of the creation.  It is also believed that angels have about seventy wings each.

Then God sent angels who inhabited the earth. One sent in exile was young Azazil whom the angels educated. He acquired their knowledge and became like them and even their leader. But he fell into disgrace because he disobeyed God to prostrate himself before Adam as the vicegerent of God on earth. Azazil goes back to Judaism and is mentioned in the Quran (2:32 etc.) as Iblis, the fallen angel. In Volksislam it is believed that Iblis is present in baths, bazaars, crossroads, intoxicating drinks, and is associated with flutes, poetry, tattoos, lies and illnesses.

God also persecuted and imprisoned many of the jinn and exiled them. Jin and ghuls are then considered terrestrial beings, occupying and a place between animals and mankind, and discussed in the second part of Al-qazwini's work.

Terrestrial cosmography

The earth, being part of the lower spheres, brings forth minerals, plants and living creatures such as animals and man. In Qazwini's classification there are seven types of living creatures – man, jinn, animals used for riding, animals that graze, beasts, birds and insects – and creatures that look strange or are hybrids.

Man

Man has the highest rank in the order of God's creation (macrocosm): he is its quintessence (microcosm) and can be both the embodiment of the angels and Satan. Man with his rational soul has the capacity to think and talk and the choice to ascend to the highest or lowest stations in life. Man's soul is immortal and he is created for immortality; he changes his place of living from the womb to the earth, and from there to paradise or hellfire (Quran 20:57).

Next to man are the jinn who were created from smokeless fire and can be in different forms. It is also believed that the jinn represent the rebellious among men or that angels were created from the light of the fire and the devils or jinn from its smoke. According to a legend the jinn were created before Adam and lived on the land, sea, plains and mountains and that God's mercy for them was boundless. They had a government, prophets, religion and laws but they became disobedient and stubborn and broke the rules of the prophets which culminated in chaos on earth. Solomon became their lord whom they obeyed.

Bestiary

God created the birds because He knew that many people would deny the existence of flying creatures, especially the angels. Furthermore, Qazwini adds as proofs that God created birds with three wings, as He did the unicorn, the Indian ass with a horn or the bat without wings; why not angels? Among the birds Qazwini classifies the Anqa or Simurgh (Phoenix) as the most known bird and the kin of birds that lived alone on Mount Qaf. This idea goes as back as to the time of Zoroaster. In more recent traditions the Anqa is a wise bird with experience gained throughout many ages and gives admonitions and moral advice.

Long before Adam was created, this bird lived without procreation; he was single and the first and most powerful bird. The “golden age” of the Simurgh was the time of Solomon in which not only ministers were near his throne but also animals and birds with whom Solomon could speak; the Anqa also talked to him and was the most respected. The second bird that is also recurring in classical Persian literature and mentioned by Qazwini is the Homa (paradise bird). When it lands on someone's head, that person becomes the king of his land. Being also a bird used in Iranian mystical symbolism is the salamander or “fire bird”, which was not seen since the time of Muhammad. Qazwini talks about the hoopoe (hudhud) that has a central role in Iranian mysticism too, only in passing; here it is described as being able to see water from afar but not the mesh that is in front of its eyes.

So the hoopoe symbolizes fate: when it comes, the eyes of man are blinded, i.e. man is not able to predict his fate. Another exceptional bird in Qazwini's list is the eagle because lions feared it and from his wings fire appears. Birds that were conceived as strange hybrids by Qazwini are the vulture, having the claws of the rooster, or the ostrich with the feet of a camel and the body of a bird; this bird eats stones and flames and can live in fire for ten years. He is also able to digest legs of a horse and birds but not date pits. The ostrich fears his own shadow and always walks against the sun. There are also other rare and strange birds, for example a big bird in Khuzistan that attacks camels and elephants and has eggs similar to crystal; the “purple bird”, a white bird that sits on a rock in the Chinese Sea and the person that looks at that rock must laugh to death, except that this bird lands on the rock; or a bird in Tabaristan which is seen in spring and carries one hundred sparrows on its tail and eats one each day.

Lapidary
Some stones are associated to jinn or are a remedy against ailments: the smaragd (zabarjad or zumrud) cures illnesses and repels devils; a stone called talk is used for talismans and magic drinks; the amberstone was first discovered by Satan; Alexander used the faylaq stone to protect his men from devils, or the manâtas, according to Aristotle from whose “Book of Stones” Qazwini often quotes, nullifies the influence of magicians and devils and protects from jinn.

Analysis

Called the “most precious cosmography of the Islamic culture” by Carl Brockelmann, Qazwini's cosmography was one of the most read works in the Islamic world since numerous manuscripts and translations from Arabic into Islamic languages have survived. Scholars presented excerpts of it to Western readers.

In Qazwini's conception, the Universe is the manifestation of the absolute Truth or God. God's command "Be!" caused all things in the universe to have a place and a reciprocal relationship between themselves. Man in the Islamic tradition has the task to understand the wisdom of God's creation as much as possible. God is the ultimate goal of that cosmic structure.

Traditional Islamic sciences are connected with cosmology that has an essential role within the metaphysical system. Whereas cosmology deals with the spiritual side of the universe, cosmography concerns itself with the physical aspect and its processes. Qazwini states that it is important that man should exert himself to investigate the wondrous and wisely conceived creation of God, to reflect on it in astonishment and understand it as much as is possible to him. In this way, man will gain the delights in both this world and the hereafter. Next to this Qazwini explains important terminology in his book: 1) marvels are a phenomenon that confuses man because he is not able to grasp its cause and effects; 2) creation is everything except God, it is either essential (body, spiritual substance) or accidental (other); 3) the strange is something which is rare and differs from the known and familiar things and causes astonishment; 4) Creation is divided into several things: it has an unknown cause, man cannot grasp it and it is known in its entirety but not in its details (e.g. the celestial spheres).

Moreover, Qazwini informs us in the introduction of his book that he left his home and family to study books because he believed that a man's best companion on earth are books. He marvelled at the wondrous and strange things in God's creation and how perfect a creation it is, as stated in the Quran (50:6). In his explanation of created things in the powerful and vast universe (51:47), he describes the orbit of the sun based on statements of scientists but also quotes a tradition in which the angel Gabriel tells Muhammad that the sun moves forward 500 years or farsakhs (1 farsakh = c. 6 km) from the time Muhammad says “No” until the time he says “Yes” one after another.

In Qazwini's view wondrous things are in the heavens and the earth, as the Quran informs (10:101), and in the seas and at their shores since it was their beginning and end where not clarified; it was part of the unknown world, inhabited with wondrous and strange creatures. Following the Judeo-Islamic tradition, Qazwini confirms that in the beginning God created one substance, then He melted it and from the smoke became the heaven and the sediments were formed to earth; heaven and earth were first together and God divided them (Quran 21:31) and He completed his creation in six days. Altogether God made seven heavens and seven earths (Quran 65:12).

Whether known or unknown, every created thing has a sign of divine wisdom within itself and represents the unity of God. Based on Ptolemy's design of the universe, Qazwini talks about 9 spheres in the heaven: the earth, the Moon, Mercury, Venus, the Sun, Mars, Jupiter, Saturn and the Sphere of spheres, which embraces all other spheres and causes day and night; they all have their own orbit. Whereas on the one hand to these and other stars Qazwini refers to the spheres or plants in scientific terms, on the other hand he supports the effects of the Moon, the North Pole and South Pole on man and animal, such as having the power to cure illnesses, with sayings among people.

Man's purpose on earth is to achieve perfection and eschew bad habits and acts. The good character outweighs in this life and the next; bad character is a sin that can not be forgiven and through it man descends to the lowest of the low in hell. A man with a good character is thus angel-like and bad character is the feature of the despised Satan. Qazwini's concern here, so to speak, anthropology.

Later influence

Ahmed Bican reworked Qazwini's cosmology in the year 1453, providing his Turkish readership with a much abridged version (reduced to ca. one fifth of the original) in plain Turkish prose, with some new materials added. Bican's rendering was later included by Donado in his Della Letteratura de Turchi, Venice (1688), in a shortlist of Turkish works he felt merited translation into Italian.

Explanatory notes

Citations

References

 (edition of the Arabic text; full text)
 (German translation)
Ansbacher, Jonas. Die Abschnitte über die Geister und wunderbaren Geschِpfe aus Qazwînî's Kosmographie, in: Fuat Sezgin, Islamic Geography vol. 201.

 (partial German translation)

 
Ruska, Julius. Das Steinbuch aus der Kosmographie des Zakarijâ ibn Muhammad ibn Mahmud al-Kazwînî, in: Fuat Sezgin, Islamic Geography vol. 201.
Von Müller, Johann. Auszüge aus dem persischen Werke Adschaibul-machlukat des Zacharia ben Mohammed Elkazwini in Sezgin Islamic Geography vol. 201.
Wüstenfeld, Ferdinand, in: Fuat Sezgin, Islamic Geography, vol. 201.

External links

Islamic Medical Manuscripts at the U.S. National Library of Medicine, https://www.nlm.nih.gov/hmd/arabic/bioQ.html#qazwini
ibid, https://www.nlm.nih.gov/hmd/arabic/natural_hist2.html
ibid, https://www.nlm.nih.gov/hmd/arabic/natural_hist3.html
ibid, https://www.nlm.nih.gov/hmd/arabic/natural_hist4.html
ibid, https://www.nlm.nih.gov/hmd/arabic/natural_hist5.html
ibid, https://www.nlm.nih.gov/hmd/arabic/natural_hist6.html
Full digitised version on Cambridge Digital Library
Encyclopædia Iranica article

13th-century Arabic books
Persian literature
Medieval Arabic literature
Bestiaries
Islamic cosmology